Justin Malou (born June 1, 1998) is a Senegalese footballer who plays as a defender for FC Tulsa in the USL Championship.

Early life and career
Malou, born in Kédougou in Senegal, moved to the United States to attended the Montverde Academy in the summer of 2016. In 2017, Malou also played in the USL PDL with SIMA Águilas, Montverde's affiliate team, making ten appearances and finishing the season with a single assist.

After graduating in 2017, Malou committed to playing college soccer at Clemson University. Over five seasons with the Tigers, including a truncated 2020 season due to the COVID-19 pandemic, Malou made 90 appearances, scoring two goals and tallying eight assists. Malou helped the team win the 2020 ACC Tournament as well as reach the quarterfinals of the 2019 NCAA Tournament. In 2020, he was named ACC All-Tournament Team.

On January 21, 2021, Malou was selected 27th overall in the 2021 MLS SuperDraft by Columbus Crew. Malou was offered the chance to play another season at Clemson in 2021, which he opted for instead of immediately signing with Columbus.

Professional career

Columbus Crew 2 
On 25 February 2022, Malou signed with Columbus Crew 2 ahead of their inaugural season in the MLS Next Pro.

FC Tulsa 
On 13 December 2022, Malou was acquired by USL Championship side FC Tulsa.

References

External links
 
 Profile at Clemson Athletics

1998 births
Living people
Association football defenders
Clemson Tigers men's soccer players
Columbus Crew 2 players
Columbus Crew draft picks
Expatriate soccer players in the United States
FC Tulsa players
MLS Next Pro players
Montverde Academy alumni
Senegalese expatriate footballers
Senegalese expatriate sportspeople in the United States
Senegalese footballers
SIMA Águilas players
USL League Two players